Sylvester Ritter (December 13, 1952 – June 1, 1998) was an American professional wrestler and college football player, best known for his work in Mid-South Wrestling and the World Wrestling Federation as the Junkyard Dog (or JYD), a nickname he received while working in a wrecking yard. He was inducted into the WWE Hall of Fame class of 2004.

Entering the ring with his trademark chain attached to a dog collar, to the music of Queen's "Another One Bites the Dust," JYD often headlined cards that drew large crowds and regularly sold out the Louisiana Superdome and other major venues, becoming "the first black wrestler to be made the undisputed top star of his promotion".

WWE author Brian Shields called Junkyard Dog one of the most electrifying and charismatic wrestlers in the country, particularly during his peak in the early 1980s. JYD was most known for his headbutt and upper body strength, the latter of which saw him regularly bodyslam such large wrestlers as the One Man Gang, Kamala, and King Kong Bundy. The word "thump," which referred to JYD's powerslam, was prominently displayed on his wrestling trunks.

College football

Ritter played football at Fayetteville State University, twice earning honorable mention All-American status, and is a member of the Sports Hall of Fame. He graduated with a political science degree.

Professional wrestling career

Early career (1976–1980)
Ritter debuted in the Tennessee territory, working for promoter Jerry Jarrett, before moving to Nick Gulas's company and using the ring name "Leroy Rochester". From there he moved to Stu Hart's Stampede Wrestling as "Big Daddy Ritter", where he captured the North American Heavyweight Championship twice.

NWA Mid South Wrestling with Bill Watts (1980–1984) 
In the early 1980s Ritter moved to Mid-South Wrestling, where booker "Cowboy" Bill Watts gave him the name and gimmick Junkyard Dog, as he would wear a long chain attached to a dog collar, and white boots. He originally came to the ring pushing a cart filled with junk called the "junk wagon" and lost most of his early matches before his character caught on and became the top face in the company. While on top he feuded with some of the top heels in the company, including a now infamous angle with the Fabulous Freebirds where they blinded him with hair cream. At the peak of the feud JYD's wife gave birth to their first child, which was made part of the storyline. It was explained that JYD could not see his new daughter, something that increased the heat on the Freebirds to the point where they needed police escorts in and out of arenas. The feud ended with the still-blinded JYD and Freebird leader Michael "P.S." Hayes wrestling in a steel cage dog collar match.

Other notable feuds involved Ernie Ladd, Ted DiBiase, Kamala, King Kong Bundy, and Butch Reed. The 1982 feud with DiBiase was particularly notable as DiBiase, once JYD's friend and tag-team partner, turned heel and subsequently won a loser-leaves-town match against JYD with the help of the loaded glove, which was a DiBiase calling card, at the time forcing JYD to leave town for an extended period of time. In 1982,  JYD was involved in a cross promotional Match for NWA and AWA against Nick Bockwinkel that aired on NWA Mid South Wrestling and AWA programming which he won by pinfall. A masked man physically resembling JYD, known as "Stagger Lee", subsequently appeared in the region and began to defeat the competition, one by one, including DiBiase. Though DiBiase and the other heels strongly suspected that Stagger Lee was in fact JYD, they were unable to unmask him to prove their suspicions. Stagger Lee disappeared once the loser-leave-town clause in the JYD-DiBiase match had expired, and JYD returned and reclaimed the North American Heavyweight Championship. The feud with Reed was notable in that Reed, a protégé of JYD, had turned heel. Reed with the help of Buddy Landell attacked the Dog many times. On a couple of occasions, they covered the Dog in chicken feathers. The two had a series of matches, many of the bouts were for the prized North American Heavyweight Championship. These matches were also notable for their brutality, which included "ghetto street fights", "dog-collar matches", two-out-of-three pin-fall matches and steel-cage matches. JYD was lured to the WWF at the peak of the feud with Reed.

World Wrestling Federation (1984–1988)

In the summer of 1984, Ritter left Mid-South for the World Wrestling Federation, where he was a mid-card wrestler but still a heavily over face. JYD debuted on a Georgia Championship Wrestling taping held at the Kiel Auditorium on August 10, 1984, when he defeated Max Blue. While in the WWF, JYD made a habit of interacting with the growing number of young people in attendance, often bringing them into the ring after matches and dancing with them. He wrestled at the inaugural Wrestlemania I, defeating Intercontinental Champion Greg Valentine by countout, but did not receive the title. Ritter won The Wrestling Classic tournament by defeating Randy Savage by countout in the finals, as well as beating Moondog Spot and The Iron Sheik in earlier rounds getting to the final. The tournament is often cited as the first WWF pay-per-view. JYD's most notable feuds in the company came against King Harley Race, the Funk Brothers (Dory Funk Jr. and Terry Funk), Adrian Adonis, Greg "The Hammer" Valentine and "Outlaw" Ron Bass. He lost to Rick Rude by disqualification at the inaugural SummerSlam (1988). He left the company in November 1988.

National Wrestling Alliance / World Championship Wrestling (1988–1993)
Ritter made his debut for the National Wrestling Alliance on December 7, 1988, at the Clash of the Champions IV. He appeared during an altercation between The Russian Assassins and Ivan Koloff, saving the latter. His first match came shortly after in a television taping in Atlanta against Trent Knight. JYD finished the year winning a $50,000 bunkhouse battle royal on December 26, which was held as a dark match after Starrcade '88 went off the air. He spent the first few months of 1989 teaming with Ivan Koloff and then Michael Hayes against The Russian Assassins. On April 2, 1989, JYD defeated Butch Reed at Clash of the Champions VI in New Orleans. Before the match he was accompanied to the ring by a jazz band.

JYD began a main event run in May 1990. On May 20 he defeated Mean Mark Callous in 39 seconds. He quickly became embroiled in a feud with Ric Flair for the World Heavyweight Championship. After gaining disqualification and non-title victories in house show matches, JYD defeated Flair by DQ on June 13 at Clash of the Champions XI. JYD was then part of the short-lived Dudes with Attitudes faction along with Sting, Paul Orndorff, and El Gigante. In the fall he feuded with Television Champion Arn Anderson, defeating him in non-title matches in less than 10 seconds on three house shows in September. He finished the year defeating Moondog Rex, The Iron Sheik, and Bill Irwin on the house show circuit.

On February 17, 1991, he won his first WCW title, teaming with Ricky Morton and Tommy Rich to defeat Dr. X, Dutch Mantell, and Buddy Landell and gain the WCW Six-Man Tag-Team Championship. He also began a short feud that month with The Master Blaster, winning each encounter. JYD and his partners held the title until June 3, when they were defeated by The Freebirds in Birmingham, Alabama. He left the promotion in August.

After dropping a significant amount of weight to improve his conditioning, Junkyard Dog returned on February 29, 1992, at SuperBrawl II. During a segment where Abdullah the Butcher was attacking Ron Simmons, JYD came out of the crowd to make the save. He found himself wrestling in tag-team matches with Ron Simmons, Barry Windham, or Big Josh for the next few months. In April and again in June, JYD faced former Six-Man Championship partner Ricky Morton, defeating him on each occasion. He also formed another tag-team, this time with The Big Cat. They feuded with The Vegas Connection (Diamond Dallas Page & Vinnie Vegas) the rest of the summer. In April 1993 he formed a new tag-team with Jim Neidhart and began a feud with Dick Slater and Paul Orndorff that would last the next few months. After defeating Slater on July 28, 1993, he left the promotion.

Later career (1994–1998)
After WCW, JYD went to the independent circuit where he wrestled for NWA Dallas. In 1995 he wrestled for National Wrestling Conference in Las Vegas where he had matches with former WWF stars; The Iron Sheik, Mr. Hughes, and The Honky Tonk Man.

Ritter had stayed active in professional wrestling until the time of his death, appearing at Extreme Championship Wrestling's 1998 Wrestlepalooza event, just one month prior. He was the founder of the Dog Pound stable in an independent Mid-South promotion, based in southern Louisiana.

Death
Ritter died on June 1, 1998, at the age of 45, in a single-car accident on Interstate 20 near Forest, Mississippi, as he was returning home from his daughter LaToya's high school graduation in Wadesboro, North Carolina. Among Ritter's last contributions to professional wrestling was the training of former WWF wrestlers Rodney Mack and Jazz.  His daughter, LaToya Ritter, and his sister, Christine Woodburn, represented him as he was inducted into the WWE Hall of Fame class of 2004 at a ceremony held on March 13, 2004, by Ernie Ladd, the day before WrestleMania XX. He is buried in Russellville, North Carolina.

Championships and accomplishments 
 Mid-South Wrestling Association
 Mid-South Louisiana Championship (3 times)
 Mid-South North American Heavyweight Championship (4 times)
 Mid-South Tag Team Championship (8 times) – with Buck Robley (1), Terry Orndorff (1), Killer Karl Kox (1), Dick Murdoch (3), Mike George (1), and  Mr. Olympia (1)
 NWA Mid-America
 NWA Mid-America Tag Team Championship (1 time) – with Gypsy Joe
 Pro Wrestling Illustrated
 Inspirational Wrestler of the Year (1980)
 Ranked No. 51 of the 500 best singles wrestlers of the "PWI Years" in 2003
 Professional Wrestling Hall of Fame
 Class of 2012
 Stampede Wrestling
 Stampede North American Heavyweight Championship (2 times)
 United States Wrestling Association
 USWA Unified World Heavyweight Championship (1 time)
 World Championship Wrestling
 WCW World Six-Man Tag Team Championship (1 time) – with Ricky Morton and Tommy Rich
 World Wrestling Federation / Entertainment
 The Wrestling Classic (1985)
 WWE Hall of Fame (Class of 2004)
 Slammy Award (1 time)
 Best Single Performer (1986)
 Wrestling Observer Newsletter
 Feud of the Year (1982) 
 Worst Feud of the Year (1990) 
 Worst Tag Team (1986)

See also

 List of premature professional wrestling deaths

References

External links

TRIBUTE PAGES for Junkyard Dog

Junkyard Dog Professional Wrestling Hall of Fame page

1952 births
1998 deaths
20th-century American male actors
African-American male professional wrestlers
American male professional wrestlers
Fayetteville State Broncos football players
People from Wadesboro, North Carolina
Professional wrestlers from North Carolina
Professional Wrestling Hall of Fame and Museum
Professional wrestling trainers
Road incident deaths in Mississippi
Sportspeople from Los Angeles
USWA Unified World Heavyweight Champions
WWE Hall of Fame inductees
Stampede Wrestling alumni
20th-century African-American sportspeople
Players of American football from Los Angeles
20th-century professional wrestlers
Stampede Wrestling North American Heavyweight Champions